Ar Janchivlin resort on mineral springs in Erdene sum of Töv Province in Mongolia. It is 25 km SW from Erdene sum center and 19 km E from Nalaikh. Janchivlin Resort is 12 km SE from Ar Janchivlin.

Populated places in Mongolia